Joseph Quincy Krumgold (April 9, 1908 – July 10, 1980) was an American writer of books and screenplays. He was the first person to win two annual Newbery Medals for the most distinguished new American children's book.

Life

Krumgold was born in 1908 in Jersey City, New Jersey, in a Jewish family, and was immersed in the world of movies from a young age: his father, Henry, operated movie theatres.

He graduated from New York University, and worked for MGM as a scriptwriter. He later became a maker of documentaries. One production, Adventure in the Bronx, was nominated for the first Academy Award for Best Documentary (Short Subject).

He married Helen Litwin in 1947; they had one son, Adam, and lived in Greenwich Village, and Hope Township, New Jersey.

He was hired by the United States Department of State to make a film about Hispanic workers in rural America. The film was created in 1953, and shares a title with Krumgold's first Newbery Award-winning novel, ...And Now Miguel.

Six years later, Krumgold won the Newbery Medal again for Onion John, a story about an eccentric immigrant in small-town New Jersey. It was named to the Lewis Carroll Shelf Award list in 1960.

Krumgold traveled extensively throughout the world, living in several places including California, Paris, and Rome. From 1947 to 1951, he lived and worked in Israel making movies that marked the founding of modern-day Israel.

He died on July 10, 1980, at the age of 72 at his home in Hope Township.

Other works

Although Krumgold is probably remembered most for the two Newbery winners, he also wrote other novels and movie scripts.

 Seven Miles from Alcatraz, a 1942 movie
 Dream No More, a 1953 movie
 The Autobiography of a Jeep, a film produced in 1943 for the United States Office of War Information
 Henry 3, a children's novel published in 1967
 The Most Terrible Turk: A Story of Turkey, a children's novel published in 1969
 Sweeney's Adventure, a children's novel published in 1942
 Thanks to Murder, an adult novel published in 1935 by the Vanguard Press

Notes

References

External links
 
 
  
 
 
 

1908 births
1980 deaths
American male screenwriters
American children's writers
Jewish American novelists
Newbery Medal winners
Place of death missing
People from Hope Township, New Jersey
Writers from Jersey City, New Jersey
Novelists from New Jersey
Screenwriters from New Jersey
20th-century American male writers
20th-century American screenwriters
20th-century American Jews
New York University alumni
American expatriates in Israel